Chili Gulch (also spelled Chile Gulch) is a gulch in Calaveras County, California. This five-mile gulch was the richest placer mining section in Calaveras County. It received its name from Chileans who worked it in 1848 and 1849, and was the scene of the so-called Chilean War. The largest known quartz crystals were recovered from a mine on the south side of the gulch.

Chili Gulch is registered as California Historical Landmark #265.

Chilean War
In December 1849, American miners in Calaveras County drew up a local mining code that called for all foreign miners to leave the country within 15 days, leading to much protest and violence. The so-called "Chilean War" resulted in several deaths and the expulsion of Chilean miners from their claims. Accounts vary widely about the details, with some including mention of Joaquin Murrieta's involvement on the side of the Chileans. The events in Calaveras County projected the Murietta legend into the politics of Chile where anti-American politicians used it to garner votes.

References

Canyons and gorges of California
California Gold Rush
California Historical Landmarks
Landforms of Calaveras County, California
History of Calaveras County, California
History of the foreign relations of Chile